Bassano Gabba (12 September 1844, Milan – 4 November 1928) was an Italian lawyer and politician. He was mayor of Milan. He served in the Chamber of Deputies and Senate of the Kingdom of Italy.

References

1844 births
1928 deaths
Historical Right politicians
Deputies of Legislature XVIII of the Kingdom of Italy
Deputies of Legislature XX of the Kingdom of Italy
Members of the Senate of the Kingdom of Italy
Mayors of Milan
19th-century Italian lawyers